The Trap is an hour-long American television dramatic anthology series about people who found themselves in situations of which they had lost control. It was broadcast on CBS from April 29, 1950. through June 24, 1950. Franklin Heller was the producer, and Joseph DeSantis was its host and narrator. Nine 60-minute episodes aired live on CBS in 1950. Its notable stars, many early in their careers, included Kim Stanley, E.G. Marshall, Leslie Nielsen, and George Reeves.

The October 17, 1950, episode was "The Vanishing Lady", starring Kim Stanley and Jeff Morrow.

References

External links
The Trap at CTVA with list of episodes

1950s American anthology television series
1950 American television series debuts
1950 American television series endings
Black-and-white American television shows
CBS original programming